Alan Poore (born 7 July 1942) is a former Australian rules footballer who played for Collingwood in the Victorian Football League (VFL) and Waverley in the Victorian Football Association (VFA).

Poore had a brief career with Collingwood, remaining with the club for four years from 1961 until 1964 but never managing to cement a regular place the side, in part due to injuries suffered in a car accident in 1962. In 1965 he joined Waverley and was a member of their premiership side that season as well as winning a J. J. Liston Trophy. He won the award again in 1966 to become the first ever player in the history of the VFA to win it twice. A centreman, he was also a dual best and fairest winner at Waverley and in 1966 represented the VFA at the Hobart Carnival. He left the club after 1971, but made a brief comeback in 1978 at the age of 35. He finished with a total of 124 games for Waverley.

References

External links
 
 

1942 births
Australian rules footballers from Victoria (Australia)
Collingwood Football Club players
Waverley Football Club players
J. J. Liston Trophy winners
Living people